Rodrigo-Antonio Grilli (born 20 November 1979) is a Brazilian tennis player.

Grilli has a career high ATP singles ranking of 441 achieved on 6 October 2008. He also has a career high doubles ranking of 198 achieved on 12 December 2011. Grilli has won 1 ATP Challenger doubles title at the 2010 BH Tennis Open International Cup.

Grilli made his ATP main draw debut at the Hamlet Cup in the doubles draw partnering Juan Ignacio Cerda.

Tour titles

Doubles

References

External links
 
 

1979 births
Living people
Brazilian male tennis players
Tennis players from São Paulo
20th-century Brazilian people